Yukiko Takahashi (born November 12, 1967) is a Japanese former volleyball and beach volleyball player who competed in the 1988 Summer Olympics, in the 1992 Summer Olympics, in the 1996 Summer Olympics, and in the 2000 Summer Olympics.

In 1988 she finished fourth with the Japanese team in the Olympic tournament.

Four years later she finished fifth with the Japanese team in the 1992 Olympic tournament.

At the 1996 Summer Olympics she finished fifth with her partner Sachiko Fujita in the 1996 beach volleyball tournament.

Her last Olympic appearance was in 2000, when she finished fourth with Mika Saiki in the beach volleyball tournament.

External links
 
 
 
 

1967 births
Living people
Japanese women's volleyball players
Japanese beach volleyball players
Women's beach volleyball players
Olympic volleyball players of Japan
Olympic beach volleyball players of Japan
Asian Games medalists in beach volleyball
Asian Games silver medalists for Japan
Medalists at the 1998 Asian Games
Volleyball players at the 1988 Summer Olympics
Volleyball players at the 1992 Summer Olympics
Beach volleyball players at the 1996 Summer Olympics
Beach volleyball players at the 1998 Asian Games
Beach volleyball players at the 2000 Summer Olympics